Emmanuel Perea (born April 8, 1985 in Tucumán, Argentina) is an Argentine footballer currently playing for All Boys of the Primera B Nacional in Argentina.

Teams
 Almirante Brown 2006-2007
 San Martín de Tucumán 2007-2008
 Santiago Wanderers 2008
 All Boys 2009–2013
 Junior de Barranquilla 2013–present

Titles
 San Martín de Tucumán 2007-2008 (Primera B Nacional Championship)

External links
 Profile at BDFA 

1985 births
Living people
Argentine footballers
Argentine expatriate footballers
All Boys footballers
Club Almirante Brown footballers
San Martín de Tucumán footballers
Santiago Wanderers footballers
Atlético Junior footballers
Categoría Primera A players
Primera Nacional players
Expatriate footballers in Chile
Expatriate footballers in Colombia
Association football midfielders
Sportspeople from Tucumán Province